Vracejte konve na místo. (English title: Return Your Watering Cans) is the fifth studio album by Czech black metal band Master's Hammer, independently released on 8 February 2012. It was released both on vinyl and CD format; the vinyl version contains two bonus tracks.

The album won the Anděl Award 2012 in the category Hard & Heavy.

As their names imply, the tracks "Lovecraft" and "Flammarion" are tributes to horror writer H. P. Lovecraft and astronomer Camille Flammarion, respectively.

Track listing

Personnel
 František "Franta" Štorm – vocals, guitar, bass, keyboards, cover art, production
 Tomáš "Necrocock" Kohout – backing vocals, guitar
 Jan "Honza" Kapák – drums
 Joe Harper – Jew's harp, throat singing (on tracks 2, 5 and 11), samples
 Petr "Blackie" Hošek – mastering, photography

References

2012 albums
Master's Hammer albums
Self-released albums